The 2021–22 Polish Basketball League (PLK) season, the Energa Basket Liga for sponsorship reasons, was the 88th season of the Polish Basketball League, the highest professional basketball league in Poland. Arged BM Slam Stal Ostrów Wielkopolski were the defending champions.

Teams 
16 teams will participate this season.

Locations and venues

Regular season

League table

Results

Playoffs
Quarterfinals and semifinals are played in a best-of-five format (2–2–1) while the finals in a best-of-seven one (2–2–1–1–1).

Bracket

Quarterfinals

|}

Semifinals

|}

Third place series

|}

Finals

|}

Awards
All official awards of the 2021–22 PLK season.

Season awards

MVP of the Round

MVP of the Month

Statistical leaders 
Leaders at the end of the regular season.

Polish clubs in European competitions

Polish clubs in Regional competitions

References

External links
Polska Liga Koszykówki - Official Site 
Polish League at Eurobasket.com

Polish Basketball League seasons
Poland
PLK